Kondowr may refer to:
 Kondowr, Hamadan
 Kondowr, Razavi Khorasan